Janaina Tewaney Mencomo (born 14 July 1984) is a Panamanian politician. She has served as Foreign Ministers of Panama since October 2022. She previously served as Minister of Government of Panama from March 2020 through October 2022.

References

External links 
 Janaina Tewaney

Living people
1984 births
Place of birth missing (living people)
Women government ministers of Panama
21st-century Panamanian women politicians
21st-century Panamanian politicians
Female interior ministers